Novosibirsk State Agricultural University  is a State University located in Novosibirsk, Russia. It was founded in 1936.

Universities in Novosibirsk Oblast
Educational institutions established in 1936
Education in Novosibirsk
Agricultural universities and colleges in Russia
1936 establishments in the Soviet Union